The cycling competitions of the 2017 South American Youth Games in Santiago were held at four venues scheduled to host sixteen events between 30 September and 8 October.

Venues

Participation

Participating nations

Medalists

Medal table

Road cycling

Track cycling

Men's

Women's

Mountain biking

BMX

References

2017 South American Youth Games
Cycle racing in Chile
South American Youth Games
South American Youth Games